The Porsche Cayenne is a series of mid-size luxury crossover sport utility vehicles manufactured by the German automaker Porsche since 2002 (Type 9PA or E1), with North American sales beginning in 2003. It is the first V8-engined vehicle built by Porsche since 1995, when the Porsche 928 was discontinued. It is also Porsche's first off-road variant vehicle since its Super and Junior tractors of the 1950s, and the first Porsche with four doors. 

The second-generation Cayenne (Type 92A or E2) was unveiled at the 2010 Geneva Motor Show in March following an online reveal. The Cayenne shares its platform, body frame, doors and electronics with the similar Volkswagen Touareg and Audi Q7. It received a facelift in 2014 with minor external changes, and introduced a new plug-in E-Hybrid version, with its public launch at the Paris Motor Show. Since 2008, all engines have featured direct injection technology. The third generation (Type PO536) was unveiled in 2017 at Stuttgart.

The Cayenne is the first Porsche assembled outside of Europe, in Kulim, Kedah, Malaysia. Only the base model 3 liter V6 is assembled in Malaysia, while other models are imported from Slovakia.  


First generation (2002) 

The Porsche Cayenne entered the market to a mixed reception, but it proved itself to have excellent performance for an SUV and had comparably good handling as well as powerful engines. The lineup initially consisted of the V8-powered Cayenne S and Cayenne Turbo. Later in the model cycle, VR6 and diesel-powered versions joined the lineup.

The base model is powered by a VW 3.2-L VR6 engine producing . The intake manifold is unique to Porsche, but otherwise the engine is largely the same as the VW engine.

Cayenne S

The S is powered by a 4.5L V8 engine with a dry-sump lubrication system and variable valve timing.

Introduced only for 2006 (as a pre-GTS concept), the Cayenne S Titanium Edition was a one-year exclusive, limited production SUV featuring a lightweight steel body, featuring an aluminium hood (lighter than the one equipped on the Cayenne S), titanium-painted accented body parts, side lower rocker body panels, Sport-Quad Tip Exhaust chrome tailpipes, 19" titanium painted alloy wheels, bi-xenon headlights, two-tone interior upholstery, Porsche PCM 2.0 w/ trip computer navigation, MP3 audio and Bose cabin surround sound. Under the hood, improvements included sport-tuned suspension, an aerodynamic body package, low-range transfer case, locking differential and a 6-speed automatic Tiptronic transmission.

Cayenne GTS
The GTS is powered with a  4.8 L V8 and features a sport suspension and  wheels. It is lighter than the Cayenne S and has an aerodynamic body kit. The Porsche Cayenne GTS has a 0– time of 5.7 seconds. A six-speed manual transmission is also offered.

Cayenne Turbo and Turbo S

The first-generation Cayenne Turbo has , and can accelerate from 0– in 5.6 seconds. A Turbo S version was built in 2006 to compete with the Mercedes-Benz ML 63 AMG. The Cayenne Turbo and Turbo S include a low-range case, a locking differential, and height-adjustable, off-road suspension.

In 2008 an updated Turbo model, featuring a larger 4.8-L engine, was revealed at the Beijing Auto Show. It produces  more power, and can accelerate from 0– in 4.9 seconds. Also revealed with the new Turbo, was a new  Turbo S model. Acceleration from 0– for that car takes 4.7 seconds and it can be had with optional ceramic composite brakes.

Cayenne Diesel
Porsche has sold a diesel version of the Cayenne, powered by a 3.0-L V6 VW TDI engine, since February 2009. The car was unveiled at the 2009 Geneva Motor Show. The diesel can accelerate from 0– in 8.2 seconds.

Cayenne S Transsyberia
The Cayenne S Transsyberia was originally a racing vehicle designed for Transsyberia rally, only 285 were built.

The street version was later built to commemorate Porsche's victory in the Transsyberia rally. It is a variant with the  direct-inject 4.8-L V8 from the Cayenne GTS. Sales began in January 2009, with a targeted production run of 600 road vehicles worldwide (285 for North America), but far fewer were actually built (102 for USA, 17 for Canada including 3 which were 6spd manual).

Cayenne GTS Porsche Design Edition 3 (2010)
In May 2009, a limited edition version based on the Cayenne GTS was introduced, designed by Porsche Design Studio and included a Porsche Design chronograph Type P’6612. Production was limited to 1000 units, 100 in the USA.

Engines

Second generation (2009)

The second-generation Porsche Cayenne went on sale in April–May 2010 as a 2011 model, with an official debut at the 2010 Geneva Motor Show. In preparation for the unveiling, the Cayenne production facility in Leipzig, Germany, closed in December 2009 to commence factory retooling for the new model, a process that took 2–3 months.

The 2011 Porsche Cayenne is larger than its predecessors, but features a more slanted rear window, less upright windshield, a more sloping roofline, door-mounted mirrors, smaller windows at the rear of the vehicle, headlights inspired by the Carrera GT, taillights that extend onto the car's tailgate, LED daytime running lights and a vastly redesigned interior much like the Panamera. The 2011 Cayenne is almost  lighter than the previous models due to removing the low-range transfer case making it slightly more fuel efficient than the previous lineup. More use of aluminium and magnesium too helped shave weight. Despite its lower stance, the new vehicle's off-road capabilities have been retained without compromising the street performance-oriented layout and design. In addition to a diesel offering, a hybrid version is available. Also, model year 2013 - 2016 diesel Porsche Cayennes are included in the Volkswagen emissions scandal.

Standard features of the 2011 Porsche Cayenne include air conditioning with dual-zone climate controls, interior air filter, tilt/telescopic leather-wrapped steering wheel with radio controls, cruise control, leather upholstery, eight-way power front seats, outside-temperature indicator, and universal garage door opener in the base model. The Cayenne S adds a power sunroof and memory for the driver's seat. The Cayenne GTS added an optional rearview camera, keyless access and start, and memory system. Finally, the most upscale Cayenne Turbo and Turbo S added a navigation system with voice recognition, optional four-zone climate controls, heated rear seats, premium sound system with six-disc CD changer.

The Cayenne's naturally aspirated and turbocharged V8 engines are shared with the Panamera and have been upgraded for faster acceleration times with more horsepower and torque, as well as more powerful direct-injection technology to improve efficiency. The base Cayenne model Cayenne is tuned to offer .

The Cayenne comes powered by a 3.6-L VR6 engine producing , the Cayenne S features the same 4.8-L V8 in the Panamera S models producing  and the Cayenne Turbo comes with Panamera Turbo's 4.8 L twin turbo V8 producing . A manual gearbox serves as the standard transmission system on the base Cayenne, with all other models featuring an eight-speed Tiptronic as standard equipment. The low-range transfer case found in the previous generation has been removed. All vehicles will feature about 10% less weight than their predecessors, 70 kg worth of standard equipment in excess of that found on the current model and a more heavily contoured rear bench.

Available Porsche Dynamic Chassis Control (PDCC) active anti-roll bars, Adaptive air suspension and Porsche Active Suspension Management (PASM).

In September 2012 Porsche announced the Cayenne S Diesel. This model is fitted with the Volkswagen 4.1-L V8 TDI engine. In October 2012, Porsche confirmed the addition of a new Cayenne Turbo S.

In July 2014, Porsche launched a facelifted Cayenne range, with minor exterior alterations and new power-train options, including a plug-in E-Hybrid and downsizing of the S model's 4.8-L V8 to a turbocharged 3.6-L V6.

Hybrid

At the IAA 2005, Porsche announced it would produce a hybrid version of the Cayenne before 2010 (Porsche Cayenne Hybrid). Two years later, at the IAA 2007, Porsche presented a functioning Cayenne Hybrid and demonstration model of the drivetrain.

Notable modifications to this car include an electric vacuum pump and hydraulic steering pump, allowing the car to function even when the engine is deactivated. A 288-volt nickel metal hydride battery is placed under the boot floor, occupying the space normally used for a spare tire.

The production version, called the 'S' Hybrid, was launched in 2010, with a 3.0-L petrol V6 linked with an electric motor to achieve  emissions of 193 g/km. The S Hybrid was launched in the U.S. market in November 2010.

Plug-in hybrid

In July 2014, Porsche announced the launch of the Porsche Cayenne S E-Hybrid, a plug-in hybrid with an all-electric range  between  under the New European Driving Cycle (NEDC) standard. The plug-in model displaced the Cayenne S Hybrid from the line up, and it is part of the revised range. The Cayenne S E-Hybrid is the first plug-in hybrid in the premium SUV segment, allowing Porsche to become the first automaker with three production plug-in hybrid models. Deliveries in Germany were scheduled to begin in October 2014. Sales in the U.S. began in November 2014.

EPA fuel economy ratings
The following are the official EPA ratings of the Cayenne S E-Hybrid compared with the others models of the 2015 line up available in the U.S.:

Engines

Guinness World Record
On 1 May 2017, a 2017 Porsche Cayenne S Diesel set the Guinness World Record for heaviest aircraft pulled by a production car. The Cayenne towed a 265-ton Air France Airbus A380 to a distance of 42 meters, breaking the previous 2013 record of a Nissan Patrol towing a 170-ton Ilyushin Il-76 to a distance of 50 meters. After the attempt Porsche repeated the test using a petrol-powered Cayenne Turbo S with 800 Nm of torque, 50 Nm less than the S Diesel, in an effort to prove the Cayenne's remarkable ability.

Third generation (2017)

The third-generation Porsche Cayenne, which was redesigned from front to back and now bears more of a resemblance to the 911, was revealed on August 29, 2017, as a 2019 model, based on the Volkswagen Group MLB platform.

A model with a more rakish roofline called the Cayenne Coupé became available in 2019. It was revealed during the 2019 Shanghai Auto Show in April 2019. At launch, there were two models, the Cayenne Coupé and Cayenne Turbo Coupé.

Safety

Engines
All engines of the third generation models are turbocharged.

Records 
In June 2021, a Porsche Cayenne Turbo GT lapped 7:38:925 at Nürburgring Nordschleife. The car was driven by test driver Lars Kern.

Variants

Cayenne Turbo GT 

On June 30, 2021, Porsche introduced the Cayenne Turbo GT version. It uses a 4.0-litre twin-turbo V8 engine (which Porsche claims to produce 631 hp) and claimed 0– in 3.3secs/0– in 3.1secs. It is equipped with 22-inch wheels with Pirelli P Zero Corsa tyres. Ride height is 18mm lower and total vehicle height is 30mm lower.

References

Notes

Bibliography

External links

 Cayenne models at official website
 Car and Driver Review: 2019 Cayenne S

Cayenne
Cars introduced in 2002
2010s cars
2020s cars
Mid-size sport utility vehicles
Luxury crossover sport utility vehicles
All-wheel-drive vehicles
Cars powered by VR engines
Hybrid sport utility vehicles
Euro NCAP large off-road
Plug-in hybrid vehicles
Partial zero-emissions vehicles
Vehicles with four-wheel steering